Puerto Rico Highway 413 (PR-413) is a rural road located at the west point of Rincón, Puerto Rico and is famous in the island for being the main access to beaches near Tres Palmas and the Rincón Lighthouse, where local and international surfing tournaments take place. It is named the "Road to Happiness".

It begins near PR-115 in downtown Rincón, at the west end of Barrio Ensenada and at the east end of Barrio Ensenada and the west end of Barrio Río Grande ends again in PR-115, en route to Aguada, Puerto Rico.

Major intersections

Related route

Puerto Rico Highway 4413 (PR-4413) is a spur route located in Rincón. It extends from PR-413 to Domes Beach near Punta Higuero Light.

See also

 List of highways numbered 413

References

External links
 

413
Rincón, Puerto Rico